These are the official results of the Women's 800 metres event at the 1982 European Championships in Athens, Greece, held at Olympic Stadium "Spiros Louis" on 6, 7 and 8 September 1982.

Medalists

Results

Final
8 September

Semi-finals
7 September

Semi-final 1

Semi-final 2

Heats
6 September

Heat 1

Heat 2

Heat 3

Participation
According to an unofficial count, 20 athletes from 14 countries participated in the event.

 (1)
 (3)
 (1)
 (1)
 (2)
 (1)
 (1)
 (1)
 (2)
 (1)
 (3)
 (1)
 (1)
 (1)

See also
 1978 Women's European Championships 800 metres (Prague)
 1980 Women's Olympic 800 metres (Moscow)
 1983 Women's World Championships 800 metres (Helsinki)
 1984 Women's Olympic 800 metres (Los Angeles)
 1986 Women's European Championships 800 metres (Stuttgart)
 1987 Women's World Championships 800 metres (Rome)
 1988 Women's Olympic 800 metres (Seoul)

References

 Results

800 metres
800 metres at the European Athletics Championships
1982 in women's athletics